Archive is compilation album by English rock band Magnum. It is a collection of previously unreleased demo and outtake material recorded from 1976 to 1983, and was released in 1993 by Jet Records.

Most of the material released here was used as bonus tracks for Magnum's expanded and remastered series on Sanctuary Records.

Artwork
The cover art was designed by Rodney Matthews.

"Trojan Sales bought second rights on my illustration "Peace... at Last" for use on the Archive album. Tracks include "Sea Bird", "Stormbringer" and "Captain America". – Rodney Matthews

Track listing

Personnel
Tony Clarkin – guitar
Bob Catley – vocals
Wally Lowe – bass guitar
Richard Bailey – keyboards, flute
Kex Gorin – drums
Dave Morgan – bass guitar, vocals (on tracks 1 – 4)
Mark Stanway – keyboards (on tracks 10 – 12)

References

External links
 www.magnumonline.co.uk – Official Magnum site
 Record Covers – at rodneymatthews.com

Albums produced by Tony Clarkin
Magnum (band) compilation albums
1978 compilation albums
Albums with cover art by Rodney Matthews